Ahmed Saad may refer to:

Ahmed Saad (Australian footballer) (born 1989), Australian rules footballer
Ahmed Saad Osman (born 1979), Libyan footballer
Ahmed Saad (weightlifter), Egyptian weightlifter
Ahmed Saad Al-Azhari, Islamic scholar

See also
 Ahmad Saad, Saudi Arabian footballer
 Ahmed Said (disambiguation)